Coeliades fidia is a butterfly in the family Hesperiidae. It is found in eastern, western and central Madagascar.

References

Butterflies described in 1937
Coeliadinae